William Hunter, Lord Hunter,  (9 October 1865 – 10 April 1957) was a Scottish advocate, judge and Liberal Party politician.

Early life 
Hunter was born on 9 October 1865, the son of David Hunter, a ship-owner from Ayr. He was educated at Ayr Academy and at the University of Edinburgh where he graduated with an MA in 1886 and an LLB in 1889.

Career 
He was admitted as an advocate in 1889. He was appointed a King's Counsel in 1905.

He was the Member of Parliament (MP) for Govan Division of Lanarkshire from 1910 to 1911 and was Solicitor General for Scotland also from April 1910 to 1911.

He was appointed a Senator of the College of Justice in December 1911, replacing the deceased Lord Ardwall. He took the judicial title Lord Hunter, and sat on the bench until 1936.

He also chaired the Committee of Inquiry into the Amritsar massacre which condemned the conduct of General Reginald Dyer.

References

External links 
 

1865 births
1957 deaths
People from Ayr
People educated at Ayr Academy
Alumni of the University of Edinburgh
Members of the Parliament of the United Kingdom for Glasgow constituencies
Hunter
Members of the Faculty of Advocates
Solicitors General for Scotland
Scottish Liberal Party MPs
UK MPs 1910
UK MPs 1910–1918
Scottish King's Counsel
20th-century King's Counsel
Deputy Lieutenants of Ayrshire